Vangelis Pavlidis (born 21 November 1998) is a Greek professional footballer who plays as a centre forward for Eredivisie club AZ and the Greece national team.

Club career

VfL Bochum
On 9 April 2016, Pavlidis signed a professional contract until the summer of 2019. Pavlidis is in the Bochum team for one and half years and has redeemed his stunning appearances in the Bundesliga U19 competitive league (45 matches - 20 goals - 13 assists) and his excellent presence with the first Bochum team in which he regularly participated in the training sessions, as well as in official friendly games. Pavlidis was voted, according to FIFA, as one of the 15 greatest talents in the finals of the previous European U17 Championship in Bulgaria. The Westphalian team is betting a lot to the young striker since the 2016–17 season, so it hastened to bind him with a new contract until 2019, as German, English and Italian teams have been very interested in the past few years.

On 15 May 2016, he made his debut with the club as a substitute in a 2. Bundesliga 4–2 away win against 1. FC Heidenheim.

Loan to Borussia Dortmund II
On 26 January 2018, Pavlidis joined Borussia Dortmund II on loan for the second half of the season. On 22 June 2018, Pavlidis loan spell was extended until summer 2019.

Loan to Willem II
On 17 January 2019, Willem II confirmed the signing of young Greek international on loan from Bochum until the end of the 2018–19 season. On 23 January 2019, he scored his first goal with the club after Marios Vrousai's assist in a 3–2 away KNVB Beker win against FC Twente.
On 16 February 2019, he scored his first goal in Eredivisie, with a right footed shot from very close range to the bottom right corner in a 3–2 away loss against Vitesse.

Pavlidis only moved to Willem II as a loanee from German side VfL Bochum in January, but he's already managed to make a solid impression in the Eredivisie, popping up with two goals and three assists in seven league games. He's also registered one goal and one assist in the Dutch Cup. On 3 March 2019, Pavlidis struck gold netting his club's second goal in a 2–4 loss to SC Heerenveen on the road.

Willem II
On 29 April 2019, Pavlidis will play his football with Willem II until 2022 after signing a permanent deal with the club. The 20-year-old striker, who was on the books at Bochum in Germany, made a loan move to the Eredivisie for Willem II in January and since then, has had a tremendous spell with the Dutch club. Across all competitions, the striker has scored four goals and registered five assists in 14 appearances. As a result, Willem II decided to make Pavlidis’ move a permanent one and the youngster signed a contract with the Dutch club through 2022.

On 2 August 2018, in the opening game of the 2019–20 Eredivisie Pavlidis scored twice as Willem II defeated PEC Zwolle 3–1. Two weeks later, he converted a penalty after he himself had been fouled, and scored a second with a header, as Willem II beat Fortuna Sittard 3–2 away from home. On 15 September, Pavlidis scored in a 4–1 away loss against Heracles Almelo. A week later he scored the only goal in a 1–0 home win game against VVV-Venlo. On 23 November 2019, he scored a brace after assisted by Mats Köhlert and Marios Vrousai respectively helping his club to acquire a vital away 3–3 draw against ADO Den Haag. These were Pavlidis’ first goals since he scored for Greece against Bosnia in UEFA Euro 2020 qualifying in October. On 13 December 2019, Pavlidis opened the score, as Willem II defeated SC Heerenveen 2–1 on the road in the Eredivisie.

On 18 January 2020, Pavlidis notched his first goal of 2020 with Willem II, netting the second marker for his team in an important 3–1 win at AZ Alkmaar. With 12 minutes remaining, Pavlidis neatly collected the ball inside the penalty area, took aim and dinked his shot over the onrushing goalkeeper to give Willem II the lead. On 22 January 2020, in the KNVB Cup, the international striker hit the target as Willem II eventually ended up losing to SC Heerenveen. On 28 February 2020, he scored with a right footed shot from the centre of the box to the bottom right corner, after an assist from Görkem Sağlam in a 3–1 home win game against FC Groningen. Midway through the second half, the 21-year-old forward then contributed with an assist for his team’s third, as his low feed across the box was tapped home by Mats Köhlert.

On 16 September 2020, in his first continental match, he scored a brace helping his club to win by a score of 5–0 against FC Progrès Niederkorn in the second qualifying round of the UEFA Europa League. On 20 September 2020, he scored a brace in a hammering 4–0 home win game against Heracles Almelo, named MVP of the game. On 4 October 2020, he was the only scorer in a frustrated 1–4 home loss against Feyenoord. On 23 April 2021, he was the only scorer in a crucial 1-0 home win against RKC Waalwijk, in his club effort to avoid relegation.  On 13 May 2021, Pavlidis scored a brace and gave an assist, in a 4–1 away game against ADO Den Haag in his club effort to avoid relegation. On 16 May 2021, Pavlidis took the ball out of the area and with an incredible energy with dribbles passed four opponents he found in front of him and at the last minute with a pinch of the ball sent it into the net, opening the score in a 2–1 home win game against Fortuna Sittard. This was the third consecutive goal for Pavlidis after the two of the previous match, helping his club to lay the foundations for the victory that would keep it in the category. Pavlidis' goal reminded a similar one that Zlatan Ibrahimović had put on 20 years ago with the Ajax jersey against NAC Breda.

AZ Alkmaar
On 9 July 2021, Pavlidis signed a contract until 2025 at Dutch club AZ Alkmaar. Pavlidis joined Willem II from Bochum in 2019 and he made 82 appearances for the club, scoring 33 times and adding 14 assists. On 14 August, he made his debut with the club during the Eredivisie match between RKC Waalwijk and AZ Alkmaar at the Mandemakers Stadion in Waalwijk.
On 29 August 2021, he scored his first goal with the club in a 3–1 away win against SC Heerenveen. On 16 September he scored his first international goal with the club, with a left footed shot from the left side of the six yard box to the centre of the goal, restored lead for his club before the break, in a 2–2 away draw against Randers FC for the UEFA Europa Conference League group stage.
On 30 October 2021, Pavlidis scored a brace, one in each half, sealing a vital 3-2 win against PEC Zwolle.  On 5 November 2021, Eredivisie included Vangelis Pavlidis in the top eleven of the league for the month October, with the Greek international forward taking the position of top striker.

On 1 December 2021, Pavlidis is one of the eleven nominees for the 2021 Puskás Award. On 12 December 2021, Pavlidis took advantage of a rebound in the area and scored down the left corner, to open the score in a tremendous 2-1 away win against champions AFC Ajax. Vangelis Pavlidis is the first player to score an Eredivisie away goal against Ajax for two teams in one calendar year (Willem II & AZ) since Arjen Robben in 2002.
 On 15 December, Pavlidis opened the score after Dani de Wit's assist in a 4-1 home win game against Heracles Almelo and AZ has qualified for the eighth finals of the KNVB Cup tournament, three days after the surprising victory against Ajax.  On 13 February 2022, AZ Alkmaar came from behind to defeat Go Ahead Eagles  in Deventer 4-1 with Pavlidis scored a brace after Dani de Wit' assists in both cases.  On 19 February 2022, he scored the winning goal after an assist from Yukinari Sugawara and gave an assist in a 2-1 home win game against Heracles Almelo, helping AZ to continue its impressive run of form which has seen them remain unbeaten since the 7th of November.

International career
On 29 August 2019, Pavlidis was called up to the Greek senior team by coach John van 't Schip for the forthcoming Euro 2020 qualifiers against Finland and Liechtenstein.

Career statistics

Club

International
Scores and results list Greece's goal tally first, score column indicates score after each Pavlidis goal.

Honours

Individual
Eredivisie Team of the Month: May 2021, October 2021, April 2022

References

External links

1998 births
Living people
Greek footballers
Greece youth international footballers
Greece international footballers
Association football forwards
Footballers from Thessaloniki
Greek expatriate footballers
VfL Bochum players
Willem II (football club) players
Borussia Dortmund II players
2. Bundesliga players
Regionalliga players
Eredivisie players
Expatriate footballers in the Netherlands
Greece under-21 international footballers
AZ Alkmaar players